York City Football Club is a professional association football club based in York, North Yorkshire, England. Founded in 1922, the club was elected to play in the Midland League, and competed in this league for seven seasons before being elected to play in the Football League in 1929 as members of the Third Division North. York were promoted to the Second Division for the 1974–75 season, which saw the team achieve their highest league placing after finishing in 15th place. York became the first team to reach 100 points in a Football League season after winning the 1983–84 Fourth Division championship with 101 points, the club's only league title. York were relegated to the Football Conference in 2004 after they finished at the bottom of the Third Division, ending 75 years of League membership. York returned to the Football League after eight years with victory in the 2012 Conference Premier play-off Final, but were relegated to the National League four years later.

York City's first team have competed in a number of nationally contested leagues, and their record against each club faced in those competitions is summarised below. York's first league match was contested with Notts County reserves in the opening match of the 1922–23 Midland League season, with their first Football League match coming against Wigan Borough. They met their 198th and most recent different league opponent, Dorking Wanderers, for the first time in the 2022–23 National League season. The team that York have played most in league competition is Darlington. York have recorded more victories against Darlington than any other club, with 47 victories from 110 matches. Halifax Town and Wrexham drew 34 of their 100 and 105 respective league encounters with York, more than any other club. The team have lost more league matches to Stockport County than to any other club, having been beaten by them 42 times in 90 encounters.

All statistics are correct up to and including the match played against Dorking Wanderers on 18 March 2023.

Key
The table includes results of matches played by York City in the Midland League, the Football League and the Football Conference/National League. Matches from the abandoned 1939–40 Football League season are excluded, as are play-offs and matches in the various wartime competitions.
The name used for each opponent is the name they had when York City most recently played a league match against them. Results against each opponent include results against that club under any former name. For example, results against Scunthorpe United include matches played against Scunthorpe & Lindsey United.
The columns headed "First" and "Last" contain the first and most recent seasons in which York City played league matches against each opponent.
P = matches played; W = matches won; D = matches drawn; L = matches lost; Win % = percentage of total matches won
  Clubs with this background and symbol in the "Opponent" column are York City's divisional rivals in the current season, the 2022–23 National League.
  Clubs with this background and symbol in the "Opponent" column are defunct. Reserve teams that York played in the Midland League are classed as defunct because they no longer compete in the English football league system.

All-time league record

Notes

References
General
For the 1922–23 to 2007–08 seasons: 
For the 2008–09 season onward: 

Specific

League record by opponent
York City F.C. league record by opponent
York City F.C. league record by opponent